Dominic Inglot (born 6 March 1986) is a British former professional tennis player and a Davis Cup champion. A doubles specialist; he made the final of twenty seven ATP World Tour events, winning fourteen, including the Citi Open and Swiss Indoors partnering Treat Huey and Franko Škugor, and also made the final of nine ATP Challenger Tour events winning six of them. He was a former British No. 1 in doubles. Also known as 'Dom the Bomb' due to his menacing serve.

Inglot made his debut in the Great Britain Davis Cup squad for the 2014 World Group first round tie against the United States. Inglot also played in the 2015 Davis Cup first round tie against the United States, and joined the team for the Final against Belgium, Great Britain winning the Davis Cup in 2015, the nation's first success in the tournament for 79 years. The Davis Cup team was awarded the 2015 BBC Sports Personality Team of the Year Award.

Early and personal life
Dominic Inglot was born in London to Elizabeth and Andrei Inglot, a former professional football player from Poland, and he has one younger brother called Alex. He learned to play tennis at St. Benedict's School and at the University of Virginia. As a Junior, he represented Middlesex County and also played on the international stage with England and Great Britain. In school, he also played volleyball – captaining the London Volleyball team – and still gained academic honours in the year 2001–02. Inglot speaks English and Polish.

For the 2004 film Wimbledon, he was selected as the tennis double for the actor Paul Bettany, whose character was a British tennis player who won Wimbledon with a wild-card entry.

University tennis career

2006–2007
Inglot was the no. 2 doubles player at the NCAA All-Tournament Team. He finished second in the team VaSID All-State event. He ended the season ranked no. 108 in the ITA singles rankings, but was ranked as high as no. 67 for the season with a singles record 16–13 with three wins over ranked players. In the ITA doubles rankings, he ended the season ranked no. 50 with Houston Barrick, but was ranked as high as no. 40. They had a doubles record of 27–6.

2007–2008
Inglot participated at the ITA Singles All-American event and NCAA Singles Championship. Finished first in the team VaSID All-State event. He won the ITA Mideast Regional Singles Title and the ITA National Indoor Singles Backdraw defeating three top ten players on the way. He was also co-Champion at the UVa Fall Invitational singles. He ended the season ranked No. 26 in the ITA singles rankings, but was ranked as high as No. 3. In doubles he was ranked at No. 50 in the ITA rankings with Houston Barrick, but was ranked as high as No. 17.

2008–2009
Inglot and Michael Shabaz became the first doubles team from the ACC to win the NCAA Men's Doubles Championship.
 In 2009, Inglot won a silver medal at the World University Games in Belgrade partnering former professional player Max Jones. He finished his senior season as the No. 15 singles player in the country.

Senior career

2009
Inglot spent most of the year on the Futures tour and partially towards the end of the year on the Challenger Tour. He got into eight finals, winning six of them, his best performance being at the Charlottesville open Challenger where he partnered Rylan Rizza. They got to the final but lost in three sets.

2010
In 2010, Inglot qualified for his first Grand Slam tournament partnering Chris Eaton at Wimbledon. In the first round, they won in four sets, Inglot's first ATP tour win. In the second round, they beat the then world no. 1 team of Daniel Nestor and Nenad Zimonjić in five sets, surprising everybody and proving to be the upset of the tournament. They were finally beaten in the third round, losing to Julien Benneteau and Michaël Llodra in four sets.

In August, Inglot and Treat Huey won the Vancouver Open, and a week later they won the Binghamton Doubles Championship for the second consecutive year.

Inglot got within sight of the doubles top 100.

2011
In 2011, Inglot had his quietest season to date as he struggled for form and even to play matches. At the start of the year, a three-month lay-off for an ankle injury became nine months after a knee problem was discovered, he got a taste of another side of life with a work placement in the city. Inglot said "The injury might have been career-ending and maybe, if I didn't have the support of the LTA, I wouldn't have been able to afford all those surgeries, so I'm lucky to be in that position and I've got to make use of it."

However, in November, Inglot won a title on a wildcard at a Challenger tour event, where he partnered Treat Huey at the Charlottesville open, winning the final in three sets.

2012

Inglot made his first ATP Tour final at the 2012 U.S. Men's Clay Court Championships in Houston partnering Treat Huey in doubles, but they lost to the much more experienced duo of James Blake and Sam Querrey.

Inglot qualified for his first tournament other than Wimbledon at the French Open, where he once again partnered Huey. They made it to the third round, defeating the fifth seeds Robert Lindstedt and Horia Tecău in straight sets in the second round, but lost to tenth seeds Aisam-ul-Haq Qureshi and Jean-Julien Rojer in the next round. Later that week, he went on to win the Aegon Trophy again partnering Huey, defeating fellow countryman Jonathan Marray and Frederik Nielsen of Denmark. This raised his doubles ranking to a career high of rank no. 86 in the world.

At Wimbledon, he partnered Huey again, but unfortunately they lost in the first round in a five-set thriller to Jonathan Erlich and Andy Ram. He also competed in the mixed doubles event for first time at Wimbledon on a wildcard. He partnered Laura Robson, and they made it into the third round, defeating defending champions Jürgen Melzer and Iveta Benešová in three sets on the way. They eventually lost to fellow Brit Colin Fleming and Hsieh Su-wei of Taiwan in straight sets both on tiebreakers.

Inglot made his second ATP Tour final of the season at the 2012 Citi Open in Washington, D.C., again partnering Treat Huey. They defeated Kevin Anderson and Sam Querrey in three sets. This was Inglot and Huey's first tour-level title of their career and as a team. This win raised his doubles ranking to a career high no. 52 in the world.

At the US Open Inglot again partnered Huey. They were beaten in the second round by 15th seeds Alexander Peya and Bruno Soares in three sets.

In late September, Inglot qualified for his first singles match at ATP tour level. He lost the match in straight sets to the far more experienced Alex Bogomolov Jr.

In his final tournament of the season, Inglot had more success with partner Huey, making it to his third ATP tour final of the season at the Swiss Indoors. They faced the top seeds and very experienced duo of Daniel Nestor and Nenad Zimonjić. Unfortunately they lost the final on a champions tiebreaker. However, this did raise his doubles ranking to a career-high no. 40 in the world, the first time he has been inside the top 40.

2013: First Grand Slam quarterfinal at the US Open 
Inglot had a slow start to the 2013 season, making it to the quarterfinals at the Qatar Open to German duo of Christopher Kas and Philipp Kohlschreiber, despite having beaten the top seeded pair of Robert Lindstedt and Nenad Zimonjić. This was followed by a first round loss at the Australian Open to 4th seeds Max Mirnyi and Horia Tecău. This was followed by a run of one win in four matches, including a first round defeat in Rotterdam. Inglot made it to his first final of the season with Huey at the Power Horse Cup in Düsseldorf, where they were defeated by German pair of Andre Begemann and Martin Emmrich.

At the French Open, the duo made it to the round of 16, where they lost to Michaël Llodra and Nicolas Mahut in straight sets. After losing in the quarterfinals of the Gerry Weber Open, Inglot and Huey made it to the round of 16 at Wimbledon, losing to eventual champions Bob & Mike Bryan.
The pair made it to their first ever Grand Slam quarterfinal at the US Open, defeating 3rd seeds Marcel Granollers and Marc López en route before losing to number 10 seeded Ivan Dodig and Marcelo Melo. Inglot finished the season with a career high ranking of 28th in the world.

In November, the Lawn Tennis Association announced a dramatic cut in elite player funding, with all financial support being withdrawn from Britain's doubles specialists and any singles players aged over 24, to reduce the number of supported players from 16 this year to just six in 2014.

2014: Indian Wells quarterfinal, Career-high doubles ranking 
In late January, Inglot made his debut in the Great Britain Davis Cup squad for the World Group first round tie against the United States in San Diego; Britain, making their return to the World Group after a five-year absence. Andy Murray and James Ward had won their singles matches, so team captain Leon Smith, rested Andy Murray for the doubles. Inglot and Colin Fleming had not played a competitive match together since a junior tournament in Corfu 13 years ago, and so the world-beating Bryan brothers, posted a four-set win against Inglot/Fleming.
Later, Andy Murray secured his second singles victory; Great Britain winning the tie 3–1, to reach the Davis Cup quarter-finals for the first time since 1986.

In October, Inglot parted company with Treat Huey, with whom he had much success over four years, because he preferred repetitious drills to the Filipino's variety-based game. After the US Open, Inglot asked Romanian Florin Mergea for the number of Portugal's João Sousa, but Mergea suggested they try out as a pairing.

2015: US Open & Paris Masters semifinals, Davis Cup Champion

At the Australian Open, Inglot and Florin Mergea beat the Bryan brothers in straight sets in only 68 minutes, eventually reaching the quarter final. The Bryan brothers were in their 400th week as the World No 1 doubles pair.
A month later at the Dubai Tennis Championships, the pair again beat the Bryan brothers en route to a semi final appearance. Leon Smith, the Davis Cup captain, came to Dubai to check on Inglot, Andy Murray & Jamie Murray who were all playing there.

In March, having beaten the Bryans twice this year, Inglot was selected for the Davis Cup first round tie against the United States in Glasgow. Following Andy Murray and James Ward winning the opening singles rubbers, Inglot and Jamie Murray played the Bryan Brothers. This was the first time Inglot and Jamie Murray had played together since the juniors, 12 years ago. After the USA duo cruised through the first two sets, the Brits rallied but fell short at the final hurdle in five set defeat. Andy Murray won his next singles match, putting Great Britain through to the Davis Cup quarter-final. The last time Great Britain won back-to-back Davis Cup matches against the US, was 80 years ago.

In April, shortly after arriving home from the Miami Open, Inglot was shocked to be informed by Florin Mergea that he intended to play with India's Rohan Bopanna in future. Inglot/Mergea were currently seventh in the race to qualify for November's World Tour Finals.

At the US Open, Inglot playing with Swede Robert Lindstedt beat his former partner Florin Mergea and Rohan Bopanna, the sixth seeds, to reach his first Grand Slam semi-final. Jamie Murray played in the other semi-final, eventually reaching the final. This dashed Inglot's hopes of playing in next week's Davis Cup Semi-Final against Australia. Two Britons had not reached a Grand Slam semi-final since Andrew Castle and Jeremy Bates clashed in the 1988 Australian Open men's doubles. 

In November, Inglot and Lindstedt reached the semifinals of the BNP Paribas Masters in Paris.

Kyle Edmund, James Ward, Jamie Murray and Andy Murray were announced for the 2015 Davis Cup Final versus Belgium in Ghent. The selection of Kyle Edmund meant that Inglot was left out, and the absence of Inglot, meant that Andy Murray would definitely have to play doubles with his brother Jamie. The inclusion of James Ward suggested that Leon Smith would replace Edmund with the more experienced Ward if the final was locked at 2–2 on Sunday, so Inglot and Dan Evans joined the British team as hitting partners. 
Great Britain went on to win the Davis Cup for the first time since 1936. Inglot and Dan Evans joined the team on the winner's podium, and they all received the same Davis Cup medals.

Inglot joined the rest of the Davis Cup team at the BBC Sports Personality of the Year Show, where they won the 2015 Team of the Year Award.

2016: Monte Carlo quarterfinal, two ATP titles

At the Australian Open, Inglot/Lindstedt were beaten in the third round by eventual champions Jamie Murray and Bruno Soares. The Lindstedt partnership continued with mediocre results until the April Istanbul Open, where they were top seeds, but had to withdraw in the second round. Thereafter, Inglot played with a variety of partners.

Inglot and Andy Murray reached the quarterfinals of the Monte Carlo Masters, to be defeated by subsequent champions Pierre-Hugues Herbert and Nicolas Mahut.

Inglot and Daniel Nestor won the Nottingham Open in their second tournament together. A week later, they went out of Wimbledon in the second round.

In September, Inglot won his second title of the year with Henri Kontinen at the St. Petersburg Open.

2017: French Open mixed doubles quarterfinal

2018: Wimbledon semifinal, Australian Open quarterfinal

2022: Retirement
He announced his retirement in March 2022.

ATP career finals

Doubles: 27 (14 titles, 13 runners-up)

Challengers and Futures finals

Doubles: 23 (18 titles, 5 runner-ups)

Performance timelines

Doubles

Mixed doubles

Notes
2018 French Open counts as 1 win, 0 losses. María José Martínez Sánchez and Marcelo Demoliner received a walkover in the second round, after Inglot and Johanna Konta withdrew.

References

External links
 
 
 

1986 births
Living people
British people of Polish descent
English expatriates in the United States
English male tennis players
English people of Polish descent
Tennis people from Greater London
Virginia Cavaliers men's tennis players
Tennis players at the 2016 Summer Olympics
Olympic tennis players of Great Britain
People educated at St Benedict's School, Ealing
Universiade medalists in tennis
British male tennis players
Universiade silver medalists for Great Britain
Universiade bronze medalists for Great Britain
Medalists at the 2009 Summer Universiade